Cycloglypha is a genus of skippers in the family Hesperiidae.

Species
Recognised species in the genus Cycloglypha include:
 Cycloglypha thrasibulus (Fabricius, 1793)

References

Natural History Museum Lepidoptera genus database

Pyrginae
Hesperiidae genera
Taxa named by Paul Mabille